XHDQ-FM is a radio station on 103.9 FM in San Andrés Tuxtla, Veracruz, Mexico. The station is owned by Grupo ACIR; it was the company's first station and, by 2022, its smallest-market property. Grupo ACIR ceased operating XHDQ-FM on June 29, 2022, as part of a retreat from three stations in southern Veracruz. The station was then sold to Quatro Media, a Xalapa-based station group owned by Carlos Ferráez, and returned to the air.

History
XEDQ-AM received its concession on July 22, 1961. It broadcast on 1400 kHz and was owned by Radio Ondas de los Tuxtlas, S.A. Two years later, on June 8, 1963, XEDQ was bought by Francisco Ibarra López, who in 1965 formed Grupo ACIR. By 1969, XEDQ had moved from 1400 to 1360; it would move to 830 sometime in the 1990s.

In 2010, XEDQ received authorization to move to FM.

In 2018, the station began using the Amor brand; it had already been using the format but branded as Radio Alegría with a retro logo calling to mind the ACIR logos of the 1980s, a nod to XEDQ's history as ACIR's first radio station.

Effective June 29, 2022, Grupo ACIR opted to shut down XHDQ-FM. The day before, XHOM-FM and XHNE-FM, the ACIR cluster in Coatzacoalcos, closed. The closure of the cluster caused the loss of 17 jobs.

On October 15 of the same year, a group led by Carlos Ferráez acquired XHDQ to be relaunched under the La Ke Buena grupera brand.

References

Radio stations in Veracruz
Grupo ACIR
Radio stations established in 1961
1961 establishments in Mexico